Roy G Beaman (born 1938), is a male former boxer who competed for England.

Boxing career
He represented England in the -57 Kg division at the 1958 British Empire and Commonwealth Games in Cardiff, Wales.

He made his professional debut on 4 May 1959 and fought in 24 fights until 1962.

References

1938 births
English male boxers
Boxers at the 1958 British Empire and Commonwealth Games
Living people
Featherweight boxers
Commonwealth Games competitors for England